The 1919–20 season was the 43rd Scottish football season in which Dumbarton competed at national level, entering the Scottish Football League and the Scottish Cup. In addition Dumbarton entered the Dumbartonshire Cup and the Dumbartonshire Charity Cup.

Scottish League

There was an improvement from the previous season with an 11th-place finish out of 22, with 39 points, 32 behind champions Rangers.

Scottish Cup

With the resumption of the Scottish Cup, Dumbarton were perhaps unfortunate to come up against Rangers in the first round.  However they gave a good account of themselves, and lost a very close encounter by the only goal, after a 0-0 draw.

Dumbartonshire Cup
For the second successive season Dumbarton failed to progress from the sectional stage of the Dumbartonshire Cup.

Final league table

Dumbartonshire Charity Cup
Dumbarton won the Dumbartonshire Charity Cup by defeating Vale of Leven in the final.

Player statistics

|}

Source:

Transfers

Players in

Players out 

Source:

In addition Robert Carmichael, David Finnie, Val Lawrence, John McEwan, James McGregor, James McIntosh, James Neil, william Wilson and James Young all played their final 'first XI' games in Dumbarton colours.

References

Dumbarton F.C. seasons
Scottish football clubs 1919–20 season